Sympistis semicollaris is a moth of the family Noctuidae first described by Smith in 1909. It is found in western North America in the vicinity of the Gulf of Georgia and east of the Cascades from south-central British Columbia to central Oregon.

The wingspan is about 31 mm.

References

semicollaris
Moths of North America
Moths described in 1909